"Alcastar" was Alcazar's second attempt at Melodifestivalen success. It made it to the final via Andra chansen, where it came 3rd. Upon release, the single shot straight to #1.

It Contains mixes by The Attic, Club Junkies and Soundfactory.

Formats and track listings

CD Single
 Alcastar (Radio Edit) 3:06
 Not A Sinner Nor A Saint (Mikki Remix) 3:45

Maxi Single
"Radio Edit" - 3:06
"Soundfactory Starstruck Anthem" - 9:33
"The Attic Remix" - 6:11
"Club Junkies 12" Remix" - 9:35
"Soundfactory Connection Dub" - 7:32
"Acapella" - 3:04
"Club Junkies Radio Edit" - 3:40

Chart performance

See also

Melodifestivalen 2005

References

Alcazar (band) songs
2005 singles
Number-one singles in Sweden
Melodifestivalen songs of 2005
RCA Records singles
Sony BMG singles
2005 songs
Songs written by Johan Fransson (songwriter)
Songs written by Anders Hansson (songwriter)
Songs written by Tim Larsson
Songs written by Tobias Lundgren
Songs written by Niklas Edberger